Be My Princess (Chinese: 影帝的公主) is an ongoing Chinese romantic series based on the novel of the same name by Xiao Jiaren, starring Jeremy Tsui and Zhou Jieqiong. This an iQiyi original series which airs on iQiyi and Mango TV from March 16, 2022, and is also available on iQiyi app and iQ.com.

Plot
Ming Wei (Zhou Jieqiong) is a part-time translator who loves acting. She was unexpectedly selected to be the female lead of award winning actor Mu Ting Zhou’s (Jeremy Tsui) upcoming drama. There she enacts the love story between a princess and a master in Ming Dynasty with Mu Ting Zhou. After an accident which caused Mu Ting Zhou to lose his memories, he only remembers Ming Wei who he protected dearly as the princess in the drama. In order to help Mu Ting Zhou recover his memories, Ming Wei starts taking care of his life.

Cast

Main
 Jeremy Tsui as Mu Tingzhou / Mu Yun
 Zhou Jieqiong as Ming Wei

Supporting
 Wu Jiayi as Ming Qiao (Ming Wei's sister)
 Hu Yunhao as Xiao Zhao (Ting Zhou's agent)
 Xu Ka Xin as Chen Zhang
 Li Ruo Ning as Xu Lin
 Yang Si Tong as Shen Su
 Wan Tong as Wang Ying Ying
 Bai Fan as Mu Chong
 Zhang Han as Dou Jing
 Rong Rong as Jiang Yue
 Wang Li as Ming Qiang
 Ma Wei Jiang as Xu Xiu
 Qi Yi as Han Xiao Ya
 Fang Jing Yi as Liang Lu Lu

Production 
The series began filming in December 2020 in Shanghai, China and wrapped up on 30 March 2021.

Official soundtrack

Main theme

Part 1

Part 2

Part 3

Part 3

Part 4

Part 5

Part 6

References

External links 
 Be My Princess on Sina Weibo
 Be My Princess on Douban

Chinese romance television series
Television shows based on Chinese novels
2022 Chinese television series debuts
2022 web series debuts
Television series by iQiyi Pictures
IQIYI original programming
Chinese web series
Mandarin-language television shows
Mango TV original programming